Wanda Does It was a television show on Comedy Central that displayed "a day in the life" of the world of comedian Wanda Sykes. The show was canceled in early January, 2005 though the last episode aired November 16, 2004. Six episodes were made.

Cast
 Wanda Sykes as herself
 Tim Bagley as Tim Brewer
 Sue Murphy as herself

Episodes

Season 1
 "Wanda Does Repo"—After her friend, Jen, buys her car and her check bounces, Wanda decides to become a repo woman to get her car back and teach Jen a lesson.
 "Wanda Does Vegas"—After Wanda's show is canceled at a Las Vegas casino, Wanda learns how to become a professional gambler and get the money she was going to get from them.
 "Wanda Does the Sky"—After taking a horrible flight, Wanda decides that if anyone else can be a pilot, she can too and flies an airplane.
 "Wanda Does the Night"—When an audience member heckles Wanda during one of her shows, Wanda decides to follow her to her job to heckle her back, but discovers that the woman who heckled her is actually a prostitute
 "Wanda Does the WNBA"—Wanda decides to prove that she's got game by becoming the coach of the WNBA team the Los Angeles Sparks. Tim is also having a dispute with someone who wants to cast Wanda in a cartoon. Guest stars include Molly Bryant as a coach, Tom Virtue as a referee, and Hans Raith as a bouncer
 "Wanda Does Photos"—After Wanda sees a bad headshot of herself that her publishing company wants to use for her book, she decides to go behind the camera to take her own photo.

External links

References

2000s American sitcoms
2004 American television series debuts
2004 American television series endings
Comedy Central original programming